"It Wasn't Me" is the first second released from Solé's debut album, Skin Deep. It was produced by Christopher "Tricky" Stewart and featured a guest verse from Ginuwine and the album version featured J-Weav. The song was a minor hit peaking at number three on the Billboard Bubbling Under Hot 100 chart, number forty-four on Billboard Hot R&B/Hip-Hop Songs chart, twenty-six on Billboard Mainstream R&B/Hip-Hop chart and nineteen on Billboard Rhythmic.

Single track listing
CD Single 2000
"It Wasn't Me" (Radio Edit) - 3:30
"It Wasn't Me" (Main Version) - 3:30
"It Wasn't Me" (Instrumental Version) - 3:30
"It Wasn't Me" (A Cappella) - 3:19

Commercial performance
The song was featured on the list of the most-played clips on BET and played on The Box for the week end of April 10.

Charts

References

1999 songs
2000 singles
Solé songs
Song recordings produced by Tricky Stewart
DreamWorks Records singles
Songs written by Ginuwine
Ginuwine songs